USS Savannah (LCS-28) is an  of the United States Navy. She is the sixth ship to be named Savannah.

Design
In 2002, the United States Navy initiated a program to develop the first of a fleet of littoral combat ships. The Navy initially ordered two trimaran hulled ships from General Dynamics, which became known as the  after the first ship of the class, . Even-numbered US Navy littoral combat ships are built using the Independence-class trimaran design, while odd-numbered ships are based on a competing design, the conventional monohull . The initial order of littoral combat ships involved a total of four ships, including two of the Independence-class design. On 29 December 2010, the Navy announced that it was awarding Austal USA a contract to build ten additional Independence-class littoral combat ships.

Construction and career 
Savannah was built in Mobile, Alabama by Austal USA. Austal delivered Savannah to the Navy, in Mobile on 28 June 2021. Savannah was commissioned on 5 February 2022 in Brunswick, Georgia before sailing to her new home port in San Diego, California.

References

Proposed ships of the United States Navy
Independence-class littoral combat ships
2020 ships